Mark James Alexander (January 23, 1911 – May 21, 2004) was a United States Army officer and paratrooper during World War II.

Born in Lawrence, Kansas Alexander was the second of four brothers, all of whom would serve in the U.S. Army during the war. He worked his way through college and received a Bachelor's Degree in Fine Arts from the University of Kansas in 1939. While working towards a master's degree, the father of a friend convinced him that war was on the horizon and the United States would be involved. Instead of waiting to be drafted, Alexander signed up with the Kansas Army National Guard in 1940 as a private, where he served in Company M, 137th Infantry Regiment. He then passed a competitive exam and received a commission as a second lieutenant. 

By the end of 1941 he had volunteered for the paratroopers and was soon transferred to the 505th Parachute Infantry Regiment (PIR), commanded by Colonel James Gavin, at Fort Benning, Georgia. The 505th soon became part of the 82nd Airborne Division, under Major General Matthew Ridgway, serving alongside the 504th Parachute Infantry Regiment and the 325th Glider Infantry Regiment.

After the division was shipped to North Africa, Alexander became commander of the 2nd Battalion, 505th eleven days prior to the regiment's first combat jump. Within a year he led three battalions of elite airborne troops into battle in Sicily, Italy and Normandy and served as executive officer for two regiments. So skilled was he in combat, the generals often used him to fill holes in the lines, until he was seriously wounded and almost died during the Normandy campaign. He recovered and was promoted to colonel in the Army Reserve after World War II, but the shrapnel that remained in his chest made him unfit for a career in the military.

Alexander was also an artist who loved painting landscapes, avid fly fisherman, community leader and an adventurer who climbed many mountains and loved the outdoors.

References

1911 births
2004 deaths
People from Lawrence, Kansas
United States Army personnel of World War II
United States Army colonels
Kansas National Guard personnel
United States Army reservists